The Atmospheric Dispersion Modelling Liaison Committee (ADMLC) is composed of representatives from government departments, agencies (predominantly but not exclusively from the UK) and private consultancies. The ADMLC's main aim is to review current understanding of atmospheric dispersion and related phenomena for application primarily in the authorization or licensing of pollutant emissions to the atmosphere from industrial, commercial or institutional sites.

The ADMLC is primarily concerned with atmospheric pollutant discharges from regulated emission sites and other fixed sources. Their review and study interests include routine discharges as well as accidental releases or releases cause by operational upsets. Their interests also include modelling dispersion at all scales from on-site short range (including dispersion modelling indoors) to long range distances. The ADMLC does not normally get involved with pollutant emissions from roadway traffic or other non-fixed sources. Nor does it get involved with air pollution topics such as acid rain and ozone formation.

History
In 1977, a meeting of representatives from UK government departments, utilities and research organisations was held to discuss atmospheric dispersion calculation methods for radioactive releases. Those present agreed on the need for a review of recent developments in atmospheric dispersion modelling and formed an informal Steering Committee, which operated for a number of years. That Steering Committee subsequently became the Atmospheric Dispersion Modelling Liaison Committee in 1995.

Although the ADMLC was initially formed to consider primarily radioactive releases from the nuclear industry, it has expanded its range of interests and its membership to more fully reflect the needs of industrial and regulatory organisations.

Membership
As listed on the ADMLC's web site, the membership of the ADMLC includes the following entities:

Atomic Weapons Establishment at Aldermaston 
Defence Science and Technology Laboratory (DSTL)
Department for Energy and Climate Change 
Department for Environment Food and Rural Affairs (Defra) 
Environment Agency
Environmental Protection Agency (Ireland) 
Food Standards Agency
Health and Safety Executive
Methodology and Standards Development Unit, Hazardous Installations Directorate
Nuclear Installations Inspectorate 
Health and Safety Laboratory
Home Office 
Met Office 
Amec Foster Wheeler 
 Nuclear Department, HMS Sultan
Public Health England
Scottish Environment Protection Agency

The Chairman of ADMLC is provided by the Met Office and the Secretariat of the ADMLC are provided by Public Health England.

Areas of interest

ADMLC facilitates the exchange of ideas and highlights where there are gaps in knowledge. It tries to provide guidance to, and to endorse good practice in, the dispersion modelling community. The ADMLC has hosted workshops and welcomes ideas for joint meetings or joint workshops with other organisations.

The ADMLC members pay an annual subscription which is used to fund reviews on topics agreed on by the members. Reviews already funded by ADMLC include:

 Dispersion at low wind speed 
 Dispersion from sources near groups of buildings, or in urban areas 
 Plume rise
 Dispersion in coastal areas, 
 The use of old meteorological data or data obtained at some distance from the release point 
 The possible use of data from numerical weather prediction programs 
 Uncertainty of dispersion model predictions as a result of  deriving atmospheric stability indicators from meteorological data 
 Proceedings of a workshop on the reliability of dispersion models for regulatory applications
 Review of the Royal Meteorological Society guidelines for atmospheric dispersion modelling 
 Calculation of air pollutant concentrations indoors 
 Dispersion following explosions

A complete list of projects, and links to each report, can be found on the ADMLC website.

See also

Accidental release source terms
Bibliography of atmospheric dispersion modeling
Air pollution dispersion terminology
Air Quality Modeling Group
Air Quality Modelling and Assessment Unit (AQMAU)
Air Resources Laboratory
AP 42 Compilation of Air Pollutant Emission Factors
Atmospheric dispersion modeling
:Category:Atmospheric dispersion modeling
List of atmospheric dispersion models
Finnish Meteorological Institute
Met Office
National Environmental Research Institute of Denmark
NILU, Norwegian Institute of Air Research
Royal Meteorological Society
UK Dispersion Modelling Bureau

References

Further reading

External links
 Atmospheric Dispersion Modelling Liaison Committee
 Air Resources Laboratory (ARL)
 Air Quality Modeling Group
 Met Office web site
 Error propagation in air dispersion modeling

Air pollution in the United Kingdom
Air pollution organizations
Atmospheric dispersion modeling
Science and technology in the United Kingdom
1995 establishments in the United Kingdom